Cheadle Hulme School is a coeducational private day school in Cheadle Hulme, Greater Manchester, England, for pupils aged 4 to 18, and a member of the Headmasters' and Headmistresses' Conference.

Founded in 1855 as The Manchester Warehousemen and Clerks' Orphan Schools, it sent pupils to an existing school in Shaw Hall, Flixton, before it moved into its own premises in Park Place, Ardwick, in 1861, and to its current location in 1869.

The school became independent in 1976 when the Labour government abolished the direct grant system.

The school covers 83 acres, has around 1,400 pupils, and in addition to its academic programme offers a wide variety of extra-curricular activities. The most recent inspection report rated "the quality of pupils’ academic and other achievements" and "the quality of the pupils’ personal development" as "excellent". The report found that Reception children demonstrate "exceptional achievement" and Junior School pupils achieve an "excellent standard across all their areas of learning". In the Senior School, pupils’ success in public examinations reflect the "high academic standards" of the School and that pupils "develop skills, knowledge and understanding to a high standard across a wide range of subjects."

In 2011, the school launched a ten-year strategic plan, including aims to spend 10% of the gross fee income in bursarial support, reintroduce the house system and complete various building projects.

History

Foundation 
In the early 1850s, life expectancy for those working in the inner-cities was extremely poor and Manchester was no exception. Many of these workers were worried about the fate of their children should they die. A school for the orphans of warehousemen and clerks, which later became the Royal Russell School, had already been set up in London in 1853, and on 20 September 1854, a representative from the London school met with some Manchester men (one of whom was Ezekiel Browne) in the Albion Hotel to gather support for it. During the discussion, support for a local school became clear, and following this meeting a committee was formed to develop the idea. The school was to be called "The Manchester District Schools for Orphans and Necessitous Children of Warehousemen and Clerks", and it was to be open to all children, regardless of gender or religious background.

The proposal was advertised to warehousemen and clerks across the north-west of England; the men were asked for one guinea or more per year, which would pay for their child's education and well-being, should the father die and the family left "necessitous". A set of rules was created, which outlined how the school should be run; these were adopted at the first meeting of the subscribers of 26 February 1855. These rules included the ages of admission (between 7 and 12 years old), with boys being taught until the age of 14, and girls until the age of 15, and that the school was for orphans and necessitous children of warehousemen and clerks only. Proposals for a complementary day school were discussed extensively, but this idea was postponed until the orphan school had been successfully set up.

In July 1855, the committee sent out advertisements for the election of the first children to the school. The earliest scholars were elected by subscribers to the institution; the condition of their election depended on a few factors, including how long the child's father had subscribed and the family's circumstances. Subscribers had a number of votes depending on how much money they had subscribed. Fifteen applications had been received by September, and on 29 October 1855, commonly referred to as the school's founding date, six children were elected into the school at the Athenaeum in Manchester.

At this time there were no premises or staff since the committee wished for more time to plan for their own premises and staff. The children were instead sent to an existing boarding school in Shaw Hall, Flixton. However, six years later they moved to Park Place, Ardwick, in the centre of Manchester. By this time it had already been decided that a new school should be built and the foundation stone of the main building in Cheadle Hulme was laid in 1867. The School moved to its present site two years later.

Foundation scheme 

Since the beginning, the school had been a boarding school, originally for the orphans (fatherless children) (known as "Foundationers") for whom it was established. As early as 1862, it started to accept fee paying boarders and an increasing number of day pupils to help to support the "Foundation Scheme".

From 1921 the School had also decided to become part of the government's education programme, choosing in 1926 to become part of the Direct Grant system, with some of the day pupils funded by grants from the Board of Education. However, boarding remained the keystone of the school's objects and the cornerstone of its pastoral and sporting activity (even as late as the 1960s), but the number of Foundationers was declining. In the 1950s the annual subscription to the Foundation Scheme was raised from one guinea to two guineas, but with the creation of the Welfare State joining the scheme became increasingly less popular. In 1955 there were 82 Foundationers and 44 paying Boarders. Seven years later, these figures had reversed.

War years 

During World War I, the school hospital was used by the Red Cross for treating over 1,400 injured soldiers.

During World War II, students from Manchester High School for Girls and Fairfield High School For Girls Droylsden were evacuated to the school. 60 Old Waconians lost their lives in World War I, and 46 in World War II.

An increasing number of day pupils were taken during the Second World War to help with the war effort as new schools in the areas could not be built.

Independent status and growth 

By the 1950s and 1960s Cheadle Hulme School had become a renowned direct grant grammar school, deciding to become, again, independent in 1976 when the Labour government abolished the Direct Grant Scheme.

During the 1970s and 1980s the School continued to thrive. With the expansion of the Junior School, the School roll topped 1,000 pupils for the first time and an anonymous donation allowed for a refurbishment of the Boarding House, although the number of children choosing to board was steadily declining. By the beginning of the 1990s the number of boarders had dropped to only 77 so the difficult decision to close the Boarding House was made by the new Head Mr Donald Wilkinson. The old dorms have since been converted into classrooms. The rest of the School was growing, however, as a new Infants Department opened in 1998 taking children from the age of 4. New buildings sprang up in the 80s and 90s including specialist buildings such as for the ICT and MFL departments.

21st century 

The new millennium saw the appointment of a new Head, Mr Paul Dixon (Head from 2001 to 2010) and the celebration of the School's 150th anniversary when over 1,400 former pupils returned to the School for reunions. The anniversary also saw the launch of a new Bursary scheme, honouring the traditions of the founding fathers of the School, and a book, "Heads and Tales", was specially produced for the occasion.

Junior School 
Built in 1970, the main Junior School building houses ten classrooms. An Infant Department was opened in 1998 by the then Headmistress Miss H. Kahn and expanded further in September 2002 to accommodate an extra class at Reception, Year 1 and Year 2. There are two classes to each year group in the Junior Department and students progress to the next year group automatically, though an exam is required to progress to the Senior Department.

There are a wide range of clubs ranging from Food Club to Tennis. Pupils have two sports lessons and one swimming lesson per week and the Year 5 and 6 students take part in regular matches in Football, Netball, Hockey, Swimming, Cricket and Athletics. Music lessons are held once a week in the Infants and twice a week in the Juniors. Pupils have regular opportunities to perform in assemblies, concerts and dramatic productions. The Junior School has many facilities available to it including a library, swimming pool, field, astro-turf pitch and tennis and netball courts. The current Headmistress is Mrs Barbara Bottoms.

Academic 

The school offers a wide range of subjects, with students taking GCSEs at the age of 16 and A Levels or the Cambridge Pre-U in the sixth form. Students also study for the school's own "Sixth Form Diploma" through the "Sixth Form Enrichment Programme".

Extra-curricular activities

Sport 

CHS pupils are involved in a range of sporting activities. There are major teams in football, rugby union, netball and field hockey. The school also currently has a number of players in the school who play for England squads in rugby and hockey; students can earn school colours for good sporting performance.

In addition to the team sport all pupils play at least an hour of sport each week as part of their timetable. The sports available include badminton, basketball and yoga, in addition to options like football, cricket and rugby.

The school offers sports scholarships for entry at 11+.

Music 
The school offers a wide range of musical opportunities to students, including a choir and various bands (concert, wind, big band). The school has a record of ambitious music making, which was initiated by Geoffrey Keating, who was Director of Music during the 1960s. Keating went on to become Director of Music at Millfield School in Somerset, but left behind a thriving choral tradition. To this was added, during the 1970s, some equally ambitious orchestral activity, and the school orchestra has tackled works such as symphonies by Beethoven and Dvořák, Gershwin's Rhapsody in Blue and the Cello Concerto by Elgar. The department is currently headed up by Mr Philip Dewhurst (Director of Music)

The school offers music scholarships for entry at 11+ and Sixth Form.

Drama 
CHS has a large Drama department which produces a number of annual plays involving wide areas of the school. In recent years the school has produced Billy Liar, Midsummer Night's Dream, Blue Remembered Hills, West Side Story, Guys and Dolls, Henry V and South Pacific.

Politics 

Regular mock elections and referendums are held, giving sixth-form students a chance to lead a campaign, followed by a school-wide vote.

The school Think Tank club has played host to guest speakers such as BBC political editor Nick Robinson, MPs Mark Hunter, Graham Brady and Kate Green and BBC North West political editor Arif Ansari.

Model United Nations 
Model United Nations (MUN) is a popular student activity. The school has developed a fine reputation as a leading MUN school, with students having won numerous awards for the standard of their debate and research skills at conferences across the United Kingdom and in Europe. As well as attending many large international conferences, the school also plays host to Model United Nations Cheadle Hulme (MUNCH). MUNCH is a popular MUN conference attended by schools from across the United Kingdom and, increasingly, from around the world.

Trips 
Cheadle Hulme School students have the opportunity to take part in a number of educational trips to enhance their understanding of the subjects that they are studying.

Politics and History students have enjoyed a number of trips in recent years, including:
 Washington D.C., where they have taken part in activities such as tours of the Pentagon, The White House and Congress, meetings with US interest groups such as Common Cause, and visits to the Smithsonian Institution.
 Westminster and Whitehall, where students have met with politicians such as shadow Chancellor George Osborne, Old Waconian Alf, Lord Dubs, local MP Mark Hunter and journalists from the Reuters news agency.
 Brussels, including visits to the European Commission and European Parliament.
 Moscow and St. Petersburg.
 The Battlefields.
Berlin
 Eyam.
 The Gambia. A geography trip to the Gambia to study ecosystems and visit the Gambia High School, a school linked to CHS. Social action aspects are also included in the trip with mosquito nets, books and pens etc. given to the young people of the linked school along with time spent with children of local refugee schools.
Tokyo technology trip

And for Lower School, years 7 to 9
 Day trips to Chester, Manchester Jewish Museum and many other places.
 Brittany trip for Year 8s.
 Ski trip to the Swiss Alps.

Also, the school has a partnership with the Columbus Fellowship and goes on many residential holidays with them.

Other activities 
Those interested in history can attend the Diggers society, where they can hear lectures from University professors and historians.

Other extracurricular activities include the business start-up scheme Young Enterprise, a philosophical society, Chess club, Go club, German club, Film club, Gourmet club, and participation in a local Mock Trial competition. Students are also encouraged to take part in the Duke of Edinburgh Award Scheme. There are many more activities which cover a wide range of areas including cooking, building, photography, and much more.

Annual events 

Since 2000, all students, parents and staff attend an evening entitled Celebration of Cheadle Hulme School once a year at the Bridgewater Hall, where the achievements of the previous year are celebrated through a series of speeches, and the talents of students are put on display. The school song, Jerusalem, is also sung by all in attendance. A speech is also given by a special guest, often an alumnus of the school. Previous speakers have included Alf, Lord Dubs and Katie Derham. This event replaced Founder's Day, which was held at St. George's Church, Stockport.

Originally, the Celebration event was also used to award the school prizes to those who had graduated in previous years. There are school prizes in each subject, as well as special prizes for things such as overall academic achievement, achievement in sport, and to thank those who served on the school council. Recipients of these prizes were invited back to be presented with them. However, since 2005, prizes have been presented at a special graduation ceremony in a marquee in the school's grounds.

Ten Year Strategic Plan

In 2011 the school launched a ten-year strategic plan, which set out how the school planned to adapt and improve over the next ten years. The plan is broken down into the following categories: the life of the mind, the world of learning, the whole person, the physical self, the wonder of creativity, service and leadership, beyond our gates, spreading the word and
enabling the future.

New Sixth Form Centre
The School's brand new Sixth Form Centre open at CHS in September 2019. The ground floor consists two main spaces: a café and a sizeable common room. Upstairs is a large independent learning area, two separate spaces for small group working, a silent study room and a meeting room. The entire building is fully accessible for wheelchair users. Upper and Lower Sixth share the building's various spaces, encouraging mixing across the two year groups and helping to create a strong sense of cohesion, whilst the new facility features a vibrant cafe area as well as covered outdoor seating.

Notable alumni

Alumni of Cheadle Hulme School are known as "Old Waconians", a remnant of the original name of the school ("Warehousemen And Clerks").

Military
 Henry Probert (1926-2007), Director of Education, Royal Air Force, 1976–1978.

Politics
 Chris Davies (born 1954), former Liberal Democrat Member of the European Parliament
 Alf Dubs, Baron Dubs (born 1932), Labour politician
 Billy Hughes (1914–1995), educationist and politician, Principal of Ruskin College, Oxford, 1950–1979

Stage, screen, radio, television and journalism 
 Katie Derham (born 1970), ITV Evening News presenter
 Aimee Lou Wood (born 1994), actress
 Phoebe Dynevor (born 1995), actress
 Emily Fleeshman (born 1986), actress

 Richard Fleeshman (born 1989), actor
 Rosie Fleeshman (born 1992), actress
 Daniel Rigby actor and comedian, BAFTA award winner
 Nick Robinson (born 1963), former BBC political editor
 Miranda Sawyer (born 1967), journalist
Sam Bloom (born 1981), actor, singer

Music
 Gordon Crosse (born 1937), Composer
 Susan Bullock (born 1958), soprano
 Nile Marr  (born 1992), guitarist

Sciences
 Alex Stokes (1919–2003), biochemist, co-discoverer of the structure of DNA.

Sport
 Alex Bruce (born 1984), footballer
 Bronte Law (born 1995), golfer
 Duncan Watmore (born 1994), Middlesbrough footballer
 Matt Winter (born 1993), cricketer
 Tyrese Campbell (born 1999), footballer
 Troy Lappalainen (born 1987), golfer
 Jonathon Billing (born 1987), cricketer

Headteachers 
 1855–61 – Mr McDougall
 1861–63 – Mr Henry Adkin
 1863–64 – Mr Harrison
 1865–66 – Mr Edward Eversden
 1867–80 – Mr William Laurie
 1880–84 – Mr Alfred Stone
 1884–1906 – Mr George Board
 1906–22 – Mr Robert Purdy
 1922–54 – Mr T.T.R. Lockhart
 1954–62 – Mr Douglas Whiting
 1962–63 – Mr David Wilcox 
 1963–74 – Mr Leslie Johnston
 1974–76 – Mr David Wilcox
 1977–89 – Mr Colin Firth
 1990–2000 – Mr Donald Wilkinson
 2001 – Mr Andrew Chicken
 2001–10 – Mr Paul Dixon
 2011–18 – Ms Lucy Pearson
 2019–Present - Mr Neil Smith

See also

 Listed buildings in Cheadle and Gatley

Notes

References

External links

 Cheadle Hulme School at ISC website

Educational institutions established in 1855
Private schools in the Metropolitan Borough of Stockport
Member schools of the Headmasters' and Headmistresses' Conference
1855 establishments in England
Cheadle Hulme
Grade II listed buildings in the Metropolitan Borough of Stockport